The Ujmani Dam, officially Ujmani Dam, is a rock-filled embankment dam on the Ibar River in the District of Mitrovica, Kosovo. It was completed in 1979 and forms Gazivode Lake, the largest reservoir in Kosovo. The dam supports a hydroelectric power station which is located at its base. It has an installed capacity of 35 MW. At  in height, it is also the tallest dam in Kosovo.

Notes

References

Dams in Serbia
Hydroelectric power stations in Serbia
Dams completed in 1979
Rock-filled dams
Zubin Potok